Andrew Koppelman (born August 29, 1957 in Nyack, New York) is the John Paul Stevens Professor of Law and professor of political science at Northwestern University. He is the recipient of the 2015 Walder Award for Research Excellence. The main focus of his research is on the intersection of law and political philosophy.  

Since May 2007, Koppelman has been a contributing writer to the legal blog Balkinization.

Education

Koppelman received his B.A. from the University of Chicago and his M.A., J.D. and Ph.D. in Political Science from Yale Law School.

Career 
Koppelman was a law clerk for Chief Justice Ellen A. Peters of the Connecticut Supreme Court from 1991 until 1992. He was a fellow at Harvard University in their program in ethics and the professions, 1994–1995. He was assistant professor of politics at Princeton University from 1992 to 1997, and was a visiting assistant professor of law in 1997 at the University of Texas at Austin.

Personal life 
He resides in Evanston, Illinois, with his wife and three children.

Selected works

Books 
 
 
 
Koppelman, Andrew (2009). A Right to Discriminate?: How the Case of Boy Scouts of America v. James Dale Warped the Law of Free Association. Yale University Press. 
Koppelman, Andrew (2013). The Tough Luck Constitution and the Assault on Health Care Reform. Oxford University Press. 
Koppelman, Andrew (2013). Defending American Religious Neutrality. Harvard University Press. 
Koppelman, Andrew (2020). Gay Rights vs. Religious Liberty?: The Unnecessary Conflict. Oxford University Press. 
Koppelman, Andrew (2022). Burning Down the House: How Libertarian Philosophy Was Corrupted by Delusion and Greed. St. Martin's Press.

Journal articles 
  Pdf.
 Koppelman, Andrew (May 1994). "Why Discrimination Against Lesbians and Gay Men is Sex Discrimination", New York University Law Review, Vol. 69, No. 2: 197-287.
 Koppelman, Andrew (1988). "The Miscegenation Analogy: Sodomy Law as Sex Discrimination", Yale Law Journal, Vol. 98, p. 145.

References

External links
Northwestern faculty profile
Andrew Koppelman website

1957 births
Living people
People from Nyack, New York
University of Chicago alumni
Yale Law School alumni
Northwestern University faculty
Northwestern University Pritzker School of Law faculty
American political scientists
21st-century political scientists